The Detroit Film Critics Society Award for Best Actor is an annual award given by the Detroit Film Critics Society to honor the best actor of that year.

Winners 

† indicates the winner of the Academy Award for Best Actor.

2000s

2010s

2020s

References

Detroit Film Critics Society Awards
Film awards for lead actor
Lists of films by award